Lee Edward Bouggess (born January 18, 1948, in Louisville, Kentucky) is a former American football running back who played for three seasons in the National Football League for the Philadelphia Eagles from 1970–1973. He was drafted by the Eagles in the third round of the 1970 NFL Draft. He played college football at Louisville.

College Career

At Louisville, Bouggess started his career as a Defensive End. He performed well enough at that position to be named to the All Missouri Valley Conference team in 1967 and 1968. Before his Senior year, Bouggess was converted to Running Back. In 1969, Bouggess excelled, compiling 6 games of 100 yards or more rushing on his way to a MVC leading 1,064 rushing yards.

Professional career

Philadelphia Eagles
Bouggess was drafted by the Philadelphia Eagles in the third round of the 1970 NFL Draft. As a rookie in 1970, Bouggess had one of the worst seasons ever with a yards-per-carry average of 2.52, the lowest in NFL history. However, he currently ranks sixth for all Eagles rookies with 50 receptions, only behind Keith Jackson (81), DeSean Jackson (62), Don Looney (58), Jeremy Maclin (56) and Charle Young (55). Bouggess would miss the entire 1972 season due to knee injuries.

In his three-year career, Bouggess played in 32 games, but never started in any. He rushed for 697 yards on 271 carries and two touchdowns with an average of 2.6 yards-per-carry. He also caught 78 passes for 589 yards and three touchdowns.

References

1948 births
Living people
Players of American football from Louisville, Kentucky
American football running backs
Louisville Cardinals football players
Philadelphia Eagles players